The Corps of Volunteer Nurses of the ACISMOM is an exclusively female unit of the Military Corps of the ACISMOM, and an auxiliary unit of the Italian Army.

The unit was formed in 1940 and was made up of a director and 40 nurses who were ladies of the Sovereign Military Order of Malta.

In the  issued in 2010, the law of 26 October 1952, n. 1785 (published in the Official Gazette No. 281 of 4 December 1952) which had established the Corps of Volunteer Nurses, with the task of "ensuring, in times of peace, war or of serious international crisis, the functioning of the services provided by the Association of Italian Knights of the Sovereign Military Order of Malta in cooperation with the health services of the State", which equated the volunteer nurses with the rank of Second lieutenant.

See also
 Malteser International

References

Nursing organizations
Sovereign Military Order of Malta
Italian Army
1940 establishments in Italy
Women in war in Italy
Female wartime nurses